Simpson (SS-21) is a Type 209 submarine, 1400-l variant and referred to as the Thomson class. The boat was  built for the Chilean Navy by Howaldtswerke-Deutsche Werft  shipyards in Kiel, Germany.

It is currently serving in the Submarine Force with a base port in Talcahuano. Between 2009 and 2012, it underwent a systems modernisation.

Gallery

References

Submarines of the Chilean Navy
Type 209 submarines
Thomson-class submarines of the Chilean Navy